Rik Vandenberghe (born 12 January 1953) is a Belgian sprinter. He competed in the men's 4 × 400 metres relay at the 1980 Summer Olympics.

References

1953 births
Living people
Athletes (track and field) at the 1980 Summer Olympics
Belgian male sprinters
Olympic athletes of Belgium
Place of birth missing (living people)